All Islamic observances begin at the sundown prior to the date listed, and end at sundown of the date in question unless otherwise noted.

Holidays for 1441 (2019-2020)

See also
List of Gregorian Islamic observances
List of observances set by the Solar Hijri calendar

External links
https://www.islamicfinder.org/islamic-calendar/

Islamic